The Sawyer Farmhouse is the residence of the family of the same name, on Maple Avenue in the Town of Goshen, New York, United States, at the edge of the Black Dirt Region. It was built about 1780, and is a two-story, five bay, Federal style frame dwelling updated about 1860 in a picturesque Italianate style.  An initial addition was built about 1810, and a one-story rear addition was added about 1890.

It was added to the National Register of Historic Places in 2005.

References

Houses on the National Register of Historic Places in New York (state)
Federal architecture in New York (state)
Italianate architecture in New York (state)
Houses completed in 1780
Houses in Orange County, New York
National Register of Historic Places in Orange County, New York
Goshen, New York